The International Association of Jesuit Universities (IAJU) is an association of higher education institutions run by the Society of Jesus. It was founded in 2018, upon the approval of Rev. Fr. Arturo Sosa SJ, Father General of the society. The current chair of the IAJU board is Fr. Michael Garanzini, SJ.

IAJU is "the international advisory and coordinating body to the Secretariat of Jesuit Higher Education and, through him, to Father General and his Assistants in matters related to higher education and the intellectual apostolate," according to its charter. It was established during an international assembly of Jesuit higher educational institutions at the University of Deusto in Bilbao, Spain.

IAJU is part of the Jesuits' higher education apostolate, and its main mission is to "contribute to the progress" of the said apostolate to "promote the development of a more just and humane world for the greater honor and glory of God."

Membership

Members of the IAJU come from the six educational associations representing geographical areas where the Society of Jesus operates. These include more than 200 Jesuit-run higher education institutions in more than 50 countries.
Association of Jesuit Colleges and Universities in Africa and Madagascar 
KIRCHER Network - network of Jesuit Higher Education Institutions in Europe and the Near East 
Jesuit Higher Educational Association South Asia 
Association of Universities Entrusted to the Society of Jesus in Latin America 
Association of Jesuit Colleges and Universities in Asia Pacific
Association of Jesuit Colleges and Universities (North America)

Notes

References
  International Association of Jesuit Universities
  IAJU charter
  Deusto Assembly 2018 official website

External links
 International Association of Jesuit Universities - Official website
KIRCHER Network
Jesuit Higher Educational Association South Asia
Association of Universities Entrusted to the Society of Jesus in Latin America
Association of Jesuit Colleges and Universities in Asia Pacific
Association of Jesuit Colleges and Universities

Society of Jesus
Jesuit institutions
Jesuit universities
Educational institutions established in 2018
2018 establishments in Italy